James Martin Fenton  (born 25 April 1949) is an English poet, journalist and literary critic. He is a former Oxford Professor of Poetry.

Life and career
Born in Lincoln, Fenton grew up in Lincolnshire and Staffordshire, the son of Canon John Fenton, a biblical scholar. He was educated at the Durham Choristers School, Repton and Magdalen College, Oxford. He graduated with a B.A. in 1970.

While at school Fenton acquired an enthusiasm for the work of W. H. Auden. At Oxford John Fuller, who happened to be writing A Reader's Guide to W. H. Auden at the time, further encouraged that enthusiasm. Auden became perhaps the most significant single influence on Fenton's own work.

In his first year at university, Fenton won the Newdigate Prize for his sonnet sequence Our Western Furniture. Later published by Fuller's Sycamore Press, it largely concerns the cultural collision in the 19th century between the United States and Japan. It displays in embryo many of the characteristics that define Fenton's later work: technical mastery combined with a fascination with issues that arise from the Western interaction with other cultures. Our Western Furniture was followed by Exempla, notable for its frequent use of unfamiliar words, as well as commonplace words employed in an unfamiliar manner.

While studying at Oxford, Fenton became a close friend of Christopher Hitchens, whose memoir Hitch-22 is dedicated to Fenton and has a chapter on their friendship. Hitchens praised Fenton's extraordinary talent, stating that he too believed him to be the greatest poet of his generation. He also expounded on Fenton's modesty, describing him as infinitely more mature than himself and Martin Amis. Fenton and Hitchens shared a house together in their third year, and continued to be close friends until Hitchens's death. Fenton read his poem 'For Andrew Wood' at the Vanity Fair Hitchens memorial service.

His first collection, Terminal Moraine (1972) won a Gregory Award. With the proceeds he traveled to East Asia, where he wrote of the U.S. withdrawal from Vietnam and the end of the Lon Nol regime in Cambodia, which presaged the rise of Pol Pot. The Memory of War (1982) ensured his reputation as one of the greatest war poets of his time.

Fenton returned to London in 1976. He was political correspondent of the New Statesman, where he worked alongside Christopher Hitchens, Julian Barnes and Martin Amis. He became the Assistant Literary Editor in 1971, and Editorial Assistant in 1972. Earlier in his journalistic career, like Hitchens, he had written for Socialist Worker, the weekly paper of the British trotskyist group then known as the International Socialists. Fenton was an occasional war reporter in Vietnam during the late phase of the Vietnam War, which ended in 1975. His experiences in Vietnam and Cambodia from summer 1973 form a part of All the Wrong Places (1988). The publication of the book revealed some of Fenton's second thoughts about revolutionary socialism.

In 1983, Fenton accompanied his friend Redmond O'Hanlon to Borneo. A description of the voyage can be found in the book Into the Heart of Borneo.

Fenton won the Geoffrey Faber Memorial Prize in 1984 for Children in Exile: Poems 1968–1984. He was appointed Oxford Professor of Poetry in 1994, a post he held till 1999. He was awarded the Queen's Gold Medal for Poetry in 2007. The American composer Charles Wuorinen set several of his poems to music, and Fenton served as librettist for Wuorinen's opera Haroun and the Sea of Stories (2001, premiered in 2004), based on Salman Rushdie's novel.

Fenton has said: "The writing of a poem is like a child throwing stones into a mineshaft. You compose first, then you listen for the reverberation." In response to criticisms of his comparatively slim Selected Poems (2006), he warned against the notion of poets churning out poetry in a regular, automated fashion.

Fenton has been a frequent contributor to The Guardian, The Independent and The New York Review of Books. He also writes the head column in the editorials of each Friday's Evening Standard. In 2007, he appeared in a list of the "100 most influential gay and lesbian people in Britain" published by The Independent on Sunday.

Fenton's partner is Darryl Pinckney, the prize-winning novelist, playwright and essayist perhaps best known for the novel High Cotton (1992).

In February 2019, The Guardian published an article criticising Fenton for his earlier stance on the conductor Robert King, who was convicted of sexually abusing five minors. The 2019 article was by one of the victims of King's repeated abuse; Fenton's earlier article concentrated entirely on the 'professional catastrophe' that King and to a lesser extent his record label would suffer, and made no mention of the harm to the boys, who were talented musicians being mentored by King.

Musical theatre influence
Fenton has been influenced in his writing by musical theatre, as evidenced in "Here Come the Drum Majorettes" from Out of Danger:

"Gleb meet Glubb.
Glubb meet Glob.
God that's glum, that glib Glob dig.
'Dig that bog!'
'Frag that frog.'
Stap that chap, he snuck that cig.'"

He was the original English librettist for the musical of Les Misérables but Cameron Mackintosh, finding his lyrics uninvolving, replaced him with Herbert Kretzmer; Kretzmer credited Fenton with creating the general structure of the adaptation. He nonetheless received credit for "additional lyrics" and considerable royalties.

Awards and honours

Books
 1968: Our Western Furniture, poetry
 1969: Put Thou Thy Tears into My Bottle, poetry
 1972: Terminal Moraine
 1978: A Vacant Possession, TNR Publications
 1980: A German Requiem: A Poem, Salamander Press, a pamphlet
 1981: Dead Soldiers, Sycamore Press
 1982: The Memory of War: Poems 1968–1982, Salamander Press, 1982, 
 1984: Children in Exile: Poems 1968–1984 Random House, 1984,  These poems combined with those from The Memory of War made up the Penguin volume, The Memory of War and Children in Exile; published in the United States as Children in Exile; Salamander Press
 1983: You Were Marvellous, selected theatre reviews published 1979–1981
 1986: The Snap Revolution
 1987: Partingtime Hall, co-author with John Fuller, Viking / Salamander Press, comical poems
 1988: All the Wrong Places: Adrift in the Politics of the Pacific Rim, reportage; Viking; Atlantic Monthly Press (1988); reissued with a new introduction by Granta (2005)
 1989: Manila Envelope, self-published book of poems
 1994: Out of Danger, Fenton considers this his second collection of poems. It contains Manila Envelope and later poems; Penguin; Farrar Straus Giroux; winner of the Whitbread Prize for Poetry
 1998: Leonardo's Nephew, art essays from The New York Review of Books
 2001: The Strength of Poetry: Oxford Lectures, Oxford University Press, 2001, 
 2001: A Garden from a Hundred Packets of Seed Viking / Farrar, Straus and Giroux
 2002: (As editor) An introduction to English poetry, Farrar, Straus and Giroux, 2002, 
 2003: The Love Bomb, verse written as a libretto for a composer who rejected it; Penguin / Faber and Faber
 2006: School of Genius: A History of the Royal Academy of Arts (2006), a history
 2006: Selected Poems, Penguin
 2006: (As editor) The New Faber Book of Love Poems
 2012: Yellow Tulips: Poems 1968–2011
 2012: The Orphan of Zhao, adaptation of the classic Chinese play for the Royal Shakespeare Company

See also

References

Sources
 
 Gioia, Dana. "The Rise of James Fenton" , The Dark Horse (No. 8, Autumn 1999)
 Hulse, Michael. "The Poetry of James Fenton", The Antigonish Review Vol. 58. pp. 93–102, 1984
 Kerr, Douglas. "Orientations: James Fenton and Indochina", Contemporary Literature, Vol. 35, No. 3 (Autumn, 1994) pp 476–91

External links

 
 Poetry Foundation profile and poems
 
 The Poetry Archive: Profile and poems written and audio

1949 births
20th-century British poets
20th-century English male writers
20th-century English poets
Alumni of Magdalen College, Oxford
English male journalists
English male poets
Fellows of the Royal Society of Literature
Formalist poets
English LGBT people
Living people
New Statesman people
Oxford Professors of Poetry
People educated at Repton School
People educated at the Chorister School, Durham
People from Lincoln, England